Andrés Trobat (4 September 1925 – 12 December 1999) was a Spanish racing cyclist. He rode in the 1952 Tour de France.

References

External links
 

1925 births
1999 deaths
Spanish male cyclists
Place of birth missing
Sportspeople from Mallorca
Cyclists from the Balearic Islands